These are the official results of the women's shot put event at the 1996 Summer Olympics, held on July 31, 1996, at the Turner Field in Atlanta, Georgia. There were a total number of 27 competitors, with two non-starters. The top 12 and ties, and all those reaching 18.80 metres advanced to the final.

Medalists

Abbreviations
All results shown are in metres

Records

Qualification

Group A

Group B

Final

See also
 1995 World Championships in Athletics – Women's Shot Put
 1996 Shot Put Year Ranking
 1997 World Championships in Athletics – Women's Shot Put

References

External links
 Official Report
 Results

S
Shot put at the Olympics
1996 in women's athletics
Women's events at the 1996 Summer Olympics